Vladimir Alexandrovich Karpets (born 20 September 1980 in Leningrad) is a Russian road bicycle racer, who last rode for UCI ProTeam . Karpets is most notable for winning the white jersey for best young rider in the 2004 Tour de France and his victories in the overall classifications of the Volta a Catalunya and the Tour de Suisse, both in 2007. Karpets is also a two-time Olympian.

Born in Leningrad, Karpets turned to cycling and, like fellow Russian Denis Menchov before him, moved to Spain where he joined .

At the 2000 Summer Olympics in Sydney, Karpets competed on the track in the men's team pursuit where Russia got eliminated in the quarter-finals by Great Britain and took eighth. He also participated in the men's individual pursuit competition, finishing 11th. At the 2004 Summer Olympics in Athens, he competed in the men's road race, helping his fellow countryman Alexandr Kolobnev to a place of tenth.

In the 2004 Tour de France, he used his strong time trialing abilities to defeat Thomas Voeckler in the youth classification on the penultimate stage. In the 2005 season, he was not at the same level in the Tour de France, but nevertheless managed a top ten placing in the Giro d'Italia. In 2007 he won stage 1 at Vuelta a Castilla y León and took the overall victory at the Volta a Catalunya and the Tour de Suisse.

Career achievements

Major results

2001
 8th Overall Tour de Pologne
 10th Time trial, National Road Championships
 10th Overall Volta ao Alentejo
2002
 2nd Overall Troféu Joaquim Agostinho
 2nd Prueba Villafranca de Ordizia
 3rd Time trial, National Road Championships
 3rd Overall Volta ao Alentejo
 4th Subida al Naranco
 8th Overall Vuelta a Castilla y León
2003
 6th Overall Vuelta a La Rioja
 8th Overall Vuelta a Aragón
 9th Grand Prix Eddy Merckx (with Evgeni Petrov
 Tour de France
Held  after Stages 4–6
2004
 1st  Overall Vuelta a La Rioja
 1st  Young rider classification Tour de France
 2nd Overall Volta a Catalunya
1st Stage 1 (TTT)
 7th Overall Vuelta a Burgos
 8th Overall Vuelta a Castilla y León
 9th GP Miguel Induráin
2005
 7th Overall Giro d'Italia
 Tour de France
Held  after Stages 8 & 9 
2006
 2nd Overall Clásica Internacional de Alcobendas
 5th Overall Vuelta a La Rioja
 8th Overall Vuelta a España
 8th Overall Volta a Catalunya
 9th Overall Tour de Suisse
2007
 1st  Overall Volta a Catalunya
1st Stage 1 (TTT)
 1st  Overall Tour de Suisse
 1st Stage 1 (ITT) Vuelta a Castilla y León
 2nd Overall Vuelta a La Rioja
1st Stage 2 
 5th Overall Volta ao Alentejo
1st Stage 3b (ITT)
 7th Overall Vuelta a España
 10th Overall Vuelta a Murcia
2008
 1st Prueba Villafranca de Ordizia
 National Road Championships
3rd Time trial
8th Road race
2009
 2nd Overall Tour de Romandie
 5th Overall Tour de Suisse
2010
 1st Stage 3 (TTT) Vuelta a Burgos
 4th Overall Tour de Romandie
 6th Time trial, National Road Championships
2011
 2nd Time trial, National Road Championships

Grand Tour general classification results timeline

References

External links

 Palmares at CyclingBase (French)
 

Russian male cyclists
Olympic cyclists of Russia
Cyclists at the 2000 Summer Olympics
Cyclists at the 2004 Summer Olympics
Cyclists at the 2008 Summer Olympics
Cyclists from Saint Petersburg
1980 births
Living people
Russian track cyclists